The Poveshon, sometimes "Povershon", is an 18th-century American cider apple, primarily used for the production of apple cider. Grown in New Jersey before and after the American Revolution, it became obsolete by the 20th century as the cider industry in the state declined. It is considered lost, though it has possibly been rediscovered.

Historical description
The Poveshon was one of the many popular apple varieties that were made into cider in New Jersey. It is from the same apple growing region on the slopes of the Watchung Mountains in Essex County where the Harrison, Campfield, and Granniwinkle also originate.

In A View of the Cultivation of Fruit Trees, and the Management of Orchards and Cider published in 1817 by William Coxe, the Poveshon is described as: 

In The Fruits and Fruit Trees of America by Andrew Jackson Downing, it is described as:

Contemporary history
The tree is possibly lost. It has been sought for many years by those who wish to save it as part of American agricultural history and to bring it back into cultivation for cider production. A tree found in upstate New York in 2015 is believed to fit the description of the tree from 19th century texts. It has yet to be proven to be the Poveshon and not one of the thousands of other American apple varieties which have been lost.

Notes 

Apple cultivars
Agriculture in New Jersey